Graham Burgin (born 4 April 1948) is a former Australian rules football player who played in the VFL between 1965 and 1971 for the Richmond Football Club.

References 
 Hogan P: The Tigers Of Old, Richmond FC, Melbourne 1996

External links
 
 

Living people
Richmond Football Club players
Richmond Football Club Premiership players
Australian rules footballers from Victoria (Australia)
1948 births
Two-time VFL/AFL Premiership players